Arrochar can refer to:

 Arrochar, Argyll and Bute, Scotland
 Arrochar and Tarbet railway station
 Arrochar Alps, Argyll and Bute, a group of small mountains 
 Arrochar, Staten Island, New York
 Arrochar (Staten Island Railway station)